The inferior orbital fissure is formed by the sphenoid bone and the maxilla. It is located posteriorly along the boundary of the floor and lateral wall of the orbit. It transmits a number of structures, including:
 the zygomatic branch of the maxillary nerve
 the ascending branches from the pterygopalatine ganglion
 the infraorbital vessels, which travel down the infraorbital groove into the infraorbital canal and exit through the infraorbital foramen
 the inferior division of the ophthalmic vein

Images

See also
Foramina of skull
Superior orbital fissure

References

External links

  (#3)
 
 

Bones of the head and neck